Mekoryuk (Nunivak Cup'ig: Mikuryarmiut; Central Yup'ik: Mikuryar) is a city located on Nunivak Island in the Bethel Census Area, Alaska, United States. At the 2010 census the population was 191, down from 210 in 2000.

History
Nunivak Island has been inhabited for 2,000 years by the Nuniwarmiut, or Nunivak Cup'ig people.

The community's first contact with Europeans was in 1821 when explorers from the Russian-American Company arrived on their island. These Russians recorded 400 people living in 16 villages on the Nunivak Island.

While conducting the 1880 United States Census, Ivan Petrof recorded 702 Yup'ik in 9 villages, including 117 people at "Koot", near the site of present-day Mekoryuk. An epidemic in 1900 left only four surviving families in the village.

In the 1930s, the Evangelical Covenant Church was built at Mekoryuk, followed by a school in 1939. People moved to the village from other areas of the island to be near the school. Reindeer herding was introduced in 1920 by an Eskimo-Russian trader. The operation was purchased by the United States government in the 1940s and a slaughterhouse was built in 1945. The reindeer were crossed with caribou from Denali Park. The resulting animals were larger and less tame than other reindeer. 34 musk ox from Greenland were transferred to the Nunivak Island in 1934 in an effort to save the species from extinction. Today, the musk-ox herd numbers around 500, and calves from this herd have been relocated and introduced to other areas of Alaska.

In the mid-20th century, Mekoryuk became the only permanent population center on the island. Until the 1940s, the traditional lifestyle and traditional ceremonies and religious beliefs were practiced.

The 1950s and 1960s brought considerable change. Mekoryuk Airport was built in 1957. When the Territorial Guard was formed, men were sent to Fort Richardson near Anchorage for training. During this time, many families moved to Bethel during the winter to be near the high school, returning in the spring for fishing and sea mammal hunting. A high school was constructed in Mekoryuk in 1978.

Geography
Mekoryuk is located at the mouth of Shoal Bay on the north shore of Nunivak Island in the Bering Sea.

Climate
Mekoryuk has a tundra climate (Köppen: ET), that borders on a subarctic climate (Köppen: Dfc).

Demographics

Mekoryuk first appeared on the 1950 U.S. Census as "Mekoryok." It appeared as the current spelling in 1960. It was formally incorporated in 1969.

As of the census of 2000, there were 210 people, 73 households, and 48 families residing in the city. There were 96 housing units at an average density of 13.0 per square mile (5.0/km2). The racial makeup of the city was 3.33% White, 90.48% Native American, and 6.19% from two or more races.  0.48% of the population were Hispanic or Latino of any race.

There were 73 households, out of which 31.5% had children under the age of 18 living with them, 45.2% were married couples living together, 15.1% had a female householder with no husband present, and 34.2% were non-families. 32.9% of all households were made up of individuals, and 2.7% had someone living alone who was 65 years of age or older.  The average household size was 2.88 and the average family size was 3.77.

In the city, the age distribution of the population shows 32.4% under the age of 18, 6.7% from 18 to 24, 29.0% from 25 to 44, 22.4% from 45 to 64, and 9.5% who were 65 years of age or older.  The median age was 36 years. For every 100 females, there were 116.5 males.  For every 100 females age 18 and over, there were 136.7 males.

The median income for a household in the city was $30,833, and the median income for a family was $33,750. Males had a median income of $25,417 versus $11,667 for females. The per capita income for the city was $11,958.  About 13.7% of families and 21.9% of the population were below the poverty line, including 36.7% of those under the age of eighteen and 15.8% of those 65 or over.

Education
Lower Kuskokwim School District operates the Nuniwarmiut School, K-12. In 1984 the building was constructed.

References

External links
 Historic photos of Mekoryuk

Bering Sea
Cities in Alaska
Cities in Bethel Census Area, Alaska
Populated coastal places in Alaska on the Pacific Ocean